Adelpha melona, the Melona sister, is a species of butterfly of the family Nymphalidae. It is found in Central and South America.

The wingspan is about 50 mm.

Subspecies
A. m. melona (Brazil (Pará))
A. m. deborah Weeks, 1901 (Colombia)
A. m. leucocoma Fruhstorfer, 1915 (Brazil (Amazonas), Trinidad)
A. m. pseudarete Fruhstorfer, 1915
A. m. neildi Willmott, 2003 (Panama)

References

Adelpha
Fauna of Brazil
Nymphalidae of South America
Butterflies of Central America
Butterflies described in 1847
Taxa named by William Chapman Hewitson